Michalis Tsamourlidis (born 22 March 1992 in Tsalka, Georgia) is a Greek footballer, who last played for FSV Duisburg in the Bezirksliga Württemberg as a defender.

References

External links
 
Footballzz Profile
Footballdatabase Profile
Myplayer Profile

1992 births
Living people
Greek footballers
AEK Athens F.C. players
Kallithea F.C. players
Panionios F.C. players
Super League Greece players
A.O. Nea Ionia F.C. players
Association football fullbacks